The 2018 WPA World Junior Nine-ball Championships was the 27th hosting of the Junior World Championship in the pool discipline 9-Ball.  The event ran from  31 October to 3 November 2018 Moscow, Russia.

Under 19 world champion was Yip Kin Ling from Hong Kong. In the final against his countryman Robbie Capito he won 11–10 against last year's finalist. In the Under 17 age group was won by Mahkeal Parris who won the final against the Norwegian Emil Andre Gangfløt 9–6. In the junior women, Chen Chia-hua won the event, winning 9–5 victory against the South Korean Seo Seoa in the final.

Defending champion were Sanjin Pehlivanović (U17), Fedor Gorst (U19) and Kristina Tkatsch (Junior). Gorst was the only champion to attempt to defend their title. While Pehlivanović now played in the Under 19 category, Tkatsch was due to age no longer eligible.

Winners

Tournament format 
All three competitions were first held in the Double-elimination tournament with a Single-elimination tournament from the quarter finals onwards. The events were all played as winner breaks.

Under 17 Junior

Under 19 Men's

Under 19 women's

References

External links

2017 in cue sports
2017 in Russian sport
WPA World Nine-ball Junior Championship